Cyclone Carlos was a strong tropical cyclone that made landfall in Australia and resulted in $12.3 million USD in damages. Carlos was first spotted on February 14 near Batchelor and it intensified to a Category 3 cyclone on February 22. The storm affected Australia for most of its life.

Meteorological history 
A severe weather warning was issued for northwest Darwin-Daly District and the Tiwi Islands. Heavy rain pounded the area on 15 February with reports of Marrara recording  and Darwin International Airport  of rain.

On 16 February the slow moving system strengthened into  After looping around the Darwin area overnight and back over land the system weakened on 17 February and BOM downgraded it to a Tropical low. A record three-day total of  rain was recorded at Darwin International Airport due to the lingering of the system.

The system moved slowly southwest on 18 February moving towards the Northern Territory/Western Australian border with a possibility of restrengthening. The community of Daly River received  of rainfall. On 19 February the system passed into the Northern Kimberley region. Rainfall totals were not as large as in previous days. Wyndham recorded  while Kalumburu recorded  of rainfall.

In the early hours of 21 February the system returned to the open waters of the Indian Ocean, causing it to redevelop back into a cyclone. The cyclone continued to track southwest at a relatively fast pace and produced a squall line that generated four tornadoes in the mining town of Karratha. It also strengthened steadily to become a category 2 cyclone.

On 22 February the system moved parallel to the Pilbara coast. The strongest gusts of  recorded at Varanus Island.

As Carlos moved away from the western coast of Australia on 24 February it strengthened into a Severe Tropical Cyclone. Carlos also caused a mini tornado to hit Ellenbrook, Perth, Western Australia on 28 February. The system dissipated on February 27.

Impact 
Tropical Cyclone Carlos caused localized flooding and damage to homes, with fallen trees, resulting in schools in Darwin being closed, along with Darwin International Airport and East Arm Wharf. The tornadoes the system produced damaged 38 homes as well as numerous cars, buildings and a school. Overall, the system caused about $16 million AUS$ ($12.3 USD).

References

External links 

Tropical cyclones in 2011
2010–11 Australian region cyclone season
February 2011 events in Australia
Tropical cyclones in Western Australia
Category 3 Australian region cyclones
Tropical cyclones in the Northern Territory
2000s in Western Australia
2000s in the Northern Territory